

Indoor records

References

Men's world athletics record progressions
Middle-distance running